Perittia karadaghella is a moth of the family Elachistidae. It is found in Ukraine and Turkey.

References

External links
lepiforum.de

Moths described in 1991
Elachistidae
Moths of Europe
Moths of Asia